Rajam is a town in Vizianagaram District of the Indian state of Andhra Pradesh. It is a nagar panchayat and the headquarters of Rajam mandal. It is situated at a distance of 51 Km from the district headquarters. The place has nostalgic association with Thandra Paparaya, the valiant Sardar of Bobbili and who is credited with slaying of Vijayaramaraju, the Maharaja of Vijayanagaram at the end of the battle of Bobbili in 1757.

Geography 
Rajam is located at 18.28N 83.40E. It has an average elevation of 42 meters (137 feet).

Demographics 
 India census, Rajam had a population of 62,197.

Government and politics 
Rajam Nagar panchayat constituted in the year 2005. Each represented by a ward member and the wards committee is headed by a chairperson. The present municipal commissioner of the town is Ramesh.

Notable people 
 
 Grandhi Mallikarjuna Rao – founding chairman of GMR Group
 Pingali Nagendrarao - popular Telugu writer, movie script writer, lyricist
 Harsha Vardhan is an Indian film character actor, comedian and screenwriter known for his works predominantly in Telugu cinema

References 

Towns in Vizianagaram district
Mandal headquarters in Vizianagaram district